Vordingborg is a municipality (kommune) in the Sjælland Region, which is on the southeast coast of the island of Zealand (Sjælland) in south Denmark. It was established in 2007. The municipality covers an area of 621 km2. It has a total population of 45,352 (2022). Its fourth and current mayor is Mikael Smed of the Social Democrats, who was elected in 2017, replacing Michael Seiding Larsen of the agrarian-liberal Venstre party.

The municipality takes its name from the town of the same name.

Overview
The Masnedsund Bridge connects the town of Vordingborg to the island of Masnedø. The Storstrøm Bridge connects Masnedø to the neighboring municipality of Guldborgsund on Falster near the town of Orehoved. The bridge is 3,199 meters long and supports two lanes of traffic and a single-track railway. It was inaugurated in 1937.

The Farø Bridges (The Farø High Bridge and the Farø Low Bridge) opened in 1985 and connect the two municipalities from the town of Bakkebølle Strand over Farø island (part of former Møn municipality) to Falster near the town of Sortsøgab. Bogø island is also part of the municipality.

As part of wider municipal reforms, an earlier Vordingborg municipality was merged with its neighboring municipalities of Langebæk, Møn, and Præstø on 1 January 2007, forming the enlarged Vordingborg Municipality.

Around 135 km (84 mi) east of Vordingborg municipality across the Baltic Sea is Bornholm, the easternmost municipality of Denmark, which is a part of the Capital Region of Denmark.

For the location of Vordingborg municipality relative to its neighbors, see the location diagram at the bottom of the corresponding article on Danish language Wikipedia, Vordingborg Kommune.

Urban areas
The nine largest communities in the municipality are:

Politics

Municipal council
Vordingborg's municipal council consists of 29 members, elected every four years.

Below are the municipal councils elected since the Municipal Reform of 2007.

Notable people 

 Johan Friis (1494 at Lundbygård – 1570) a Danish statesman, Chancellor under King Christian III of Denmark
 Clara Tybjerg (1864 in Kalvehave – 1941) a women's rights activist, pacifist and educator
 Niels Nielsen (1865 in Ørslev – 1931) a mathematician, specialized in mathematical analysis
 Elna Munch (1871 in Kalvehave – 1945) a Danish feminist and politician,
 Nina Hole (1941 – 2016 in Ørslev) a Danish artist, sculptor, and performance artist
 Henrik Koefoed (born 1955 in Kalvehave) a Danish actor 
 Cecilie Thomsen (born 1974 on Bogø), actress and model

See also
 List of churches in Vordingborg Municipality

References
 
 Municipal statistics: NetBorger Kommunefakta, delivered from KMD aka Kommunedata (Municipal Data)
 Municipal mergers and neighbors: Eniro new municipalities map

External links

 

 
Municipalities of Region Zealand
Municipalities of Denmark
Populated places established in 2007